Wholesale Meats and Fish is the second album by the alternative rock band Letters to Cleo, released in 1995. The first single was "Awake".

Critical reception

Trouser Press wrote that "'Little Rosa', the album's highlight, is '60s-influenced jangle-pop genius." Entertainment Weekly determined that "too often singer Kay Hanley sounds like a petulant Juliana Hatfield on their soapy, overdramatic love songs."

Track listing
all songs by Kay Hanley and Letters to Cleo

"Demon Rock" – 3:24
"Fast Way" – 3:59
"Jennifer" – 5:10
"Awake" – 3:55
"Laudanum" – 4:00
"Acid Jed" – 3:02
"Pizza Cutter" – 4:02
"St. Peter" – 4:13
"Little Rosa" – 3:07
"Do What You Want, Yeah" – 2:51
"He's Got an Answer" – 3:49
"I Could Sleep (The Wuss Song)" – 3:09

Chart positions

Album
1995   Wholesale Meats and Fish   The Billboard 200        No. 188
1995   Wholesale Meats and Fish   Heatseekers              No. 11

Singles
1995   Awake  The Billboard Hot 100    No. 88
1995   Awake  Modern Rock Tracks       No. 17

References 

Letters to Cleo albums
1995 albums